Brook is a small village and civil parish in the borough of Ashford in Kent, England, centred  east-northeast of the town of Ashford.

Geography
Brook is in a gently rolling valley top immediately south of the North Downs.  The brook referred to rises here and flows east to join the combined East and West Stour, that is, the River Great Stour.  The south-east fifth of the parish is woodland.  Brook has a small village museum.  The human population of this area rose by 3 during the 10 years to the United Kingdom Census 2011.

History
The 11th century Grade I listed parish church is dedicated to St Mary.  There is also a Baptist chapel. The church of St. Mary, erected about 1075, is of stone, in the Early Norman style, and has a tower containing 3 bells: the tower was struck by lightning in 1896, and the northwest corner destroyed, but was restored in 1899: there are 160 sittings. John Betjeman described the church as "unaltered early Norman church ... a massive church which carries its longevity more convincingly than many older and tidier churches".

References

External links

 Brook Parish Council
 Brook St Mary's church
 Brook Baptist Chapel

Villages in Kent
Villages in the Borough of Ashford
Civil parishes in Ashford, Kent